Ruti is a neighborhood within Mbarara City

Location
The area borders with Nyakayojo Division in the west, Nyakakoni in the North, Ruharo in the North east, and Katete ward in the East.

Overview
Ruti is a ward of Nyamitanga Division in Mbarara City. Its one of the busiest suburbs in Mbarara.
Next to Ruti is the famous secondary school called Nyakayojo Secondary School.
Ruti is known for acting as the place where long distance trucks heading to Rwanda and Burundi park.
The area records high H.I.V status levels in Uganda.

See also
 Mbarara
 Nyakayojo Secondary School
 Biharwe

References

Mbarara